Kameno Municipality  (Bulgarian: Община Камено, Obshtina Kameno) is a municipality in Burgas Province, Bulgaria. It includes the towns of Kameno and a number of villages.

Demographics

Religion 
According to the latest Bulgarian census of 2011, the religious composition, among those who answered the optional question on religious identification, was the following:

References

External links

 

Municipalities in Burgas Province